Harmon School, also known as Warwick No. 225, is a historic rural school building located near Millsboro, Sussex County, Delaware. It was built in the early 1920s, and is a one-story, frame structure with wood shingles in the Colonial Revival style. It sits on a concrete foundation and has a gable roof and large, square brick central chimney. The front facade features a central pedimented portico with four square columns and two square pilasters. The Harmon School was originally formed to be used exclusively for Nanticoke Indian students until after the new school was constructed in the 1920s. The introduction of African American teachers and students caused the Indian students to withdraw and form the Indian Mission School.

It was added to the National Register of Historic Places in 1979.

References

School buildings on the National Register of Historic Places in Delaware
Colonial Revival architecture in Delaware
Schools in Sussex County, Delaware
Nanticoke tribe
National Register of Historic Places in Sussex County, Delaware